Never Bend (1960–1977) was a champion American Thoroughbred racehorse who was the 1962 American Champion Two-Year-Old and later became a leading sire in England.

Racing Career

1962: Two-year-old season
Foaled at Claiborne Farm for owner/breeder Harry F. Guggenheim, Never Bend was the dominant two-year-old racing in the United States in 1962. His performances that year earned him the Eclipse Award for Outstanding Two-Year-Old Male Horse, and he was  considered an early favorite for the ensuing 1963 U.S. Triple Crown races.

1963: Three-year-old season

Kentucky Derby
The 1963 edition of the Kentucky Derby, the first leg of the Triple Crown series, saw 120,000 patrons gather at Churchill Downs for a race that featured three Thoroughbred stars. TIME magazine reported jockey Eddie Arcaro as saying: "I can't remember a Derby creating so much excitement."

Although Never Bend had won the Flamingo Stakes at Hialeah Park and the Stepping Stone Purse at Churchill Downs, leading up to May's Kentucky Derby he had been outshone by the undefeated Candy Spots, that had won the Florida Derby and Santa Anita Derby. At the same time, a Greentree Stable colt named No Robbery had won the Wood Memorial Stakes and also came into the Derby undefeated. By post time, bettors made Candy Spots the 3-2 favorite, No Robbery the second choice at 5-2, then Never Bend the third choice at odds of 3-1. When the gate opened, Never Bend quickly took the lead and held it until the eighth pole, when Chateaugay came from sixth place to win by 1¼ lengths.

Preakness Stakes
In the Preakness Stakes at Pimlico Race Course in Baltimore, Maryland, Never Bend again faced Candy Spots and Chateaugay. Bettors still made Candy Spots the favorite. As he had in the Derby, Never Bend charged out to an early lead with Candy Spots in third. As they turned into the homestretch, Chateaugay came from well back to catch and pass Never Bend, that had fallen behind the then front-running Candy Spots. He finished third behind Chateaugay and the race winner, Candy Spots.

Later three-year-old season
Never Bend did not run in the third leg of the U.S. Triple Crown series. Before being retired, in the fall of that year, he finished second to Mongo in the United Nations Handicap and second to the Kelso in the Woodward Stakes. In October, Never Bend easily defeated Chateaugay in winning the Yankee Handicap by four lengths at Suffolk Downs.

Retirement and Breeding Career
Never Bend retired to stand at stud for the 1964 season and became a very important sire, producing 61 stakes winners. His most famous son was Mill Reef, ranked fourth on the list of the European top 100 horses of the 20th century and a leading sire whose race wins include The Derby and the Prix de l'Arc de Triomphe. Never Bend's other progeny included Riverman, a two-time leading sire in France; Triple Bend, which set a world-record time for seven furlongs on dirt; and J. O. Tobin, Champion two-year-old in England and Eclipse Award sprinter in the U.S. at age four, that handed Seattle Slew his first defeat. Never Bend was also the broodmare sire of 115 stakes winners, with two of his mares voted Kentucky Broodmare of the Year.

Never Bend died in 1977 at the age of 17.

Pedigree

References

 Never Bend's pedigree and racing stats
 TIME magazine article on the 1963 Kentucky Derby

1960 racehorse births
1977 racehorse deaths
Racehorses bred in Kentucky
Racehorses trained in the United States
American Champion racehorses
British Champion Thoroughbred Sires
Thoroughbred family 19-b
Chefs-de-Race